"Dahnama" is a written monument of Azerbaijani literature, a poem written in the mesnevi genre, a classic of Azerbaijani literature, by Shah Ismail Khatai. It is a creation of 1506 in Azerbaijani. This is one of the first poems in the Azerbaijani literature, written in the mesnevi genre.

"Dahnama" means "Ten Letters", as mesnevi contains ten love letters between a young man in love (that is the poet) and his beloved. In total, the poem contains more than 1400 couplets (the poem consists of 1532 baytes).

Study and publication 
In 1923, the researcher Salman Mumtaz published an incomplete list of "Dahname" from the manuscript of the 17th century, which is kept at the Institute of Manuscripts of the National Academy of Sciences of Azerbaijan, in Baku. In the preface to this edition, Mumtaz wrote:

In 1961, Azizagha Mammadov prepared a two-volume edition of the poet's works entitled "Shah Ismail Khatai", in which he considered the main principles of the creating scientific-critical texts "Dahnama".

In 1967, the researcher Gasim Hasanov published his work "Syntax Dahnama", in which he analysed the definitional phrases in the poem. Back in 1962, Hasanov wrote that the definitional phrases found in the poem are largely identical to those in the modern Azerbaijani language.

In 1977, in Minaye Javadova's work "The Lexicon of Shah Ismail Khatai" (Based on the poem "Dahnama"), the author talks about the history of studying the poem "Dahnama" and the meaning of the Azerbaijani language during the reign of the Safavids. In this work, Javadova notes that Dahnama occupies a special place in the literary heritage of Khatai, being one of the most perfect written literary monuments created in the Azerbaijani language.

Manuscripts 
The Bakhter Museum, located in the city of Mazar-i-Sharif in Afghanistan, contains a manuscript rewritten by the calligrapher Mir Iman Gazvin (1552-1613), which begins with the mesnevi "Dahnama".

The manuscript of the poem, compiled in the 17th century, is kept at the Institute of Manuscripts of the National Academy of Sciences of Azerbaijan, in Baku.

One of the lists of "Dahnama" is kept in St. Petersburg, whose first annotated description was given by the orientalist Nikolai Marr at the request of Vladimir Minorsky in 1923. A detailed annotated description of this list was also given by the Turkish literary critic Ismayil Hikmet in his book the "History of Azerbaijani Literature" (Baku, 1928). 

It is also known that one of the "Dahnama" manuscripts was handed over to the library of the Azerbaijan State Publishing House in 1923. Its further fate is unknown.

Literary analysis 
"Dahnama" was created in the sphere of the so-called "palace literature". According to the philologist Hasan Guliyev, the poem contains many lyrical digressions written in forms close to folk poetry. Here, the experiences of a couple in love are reflected in a romantic form. Each chapter is a separate, complete, independent "letter-appeal" that brings together the image of the hero-poet and his beloved. The action in the work is slowed down, and the images of the heroes are static. The whole poem is a love monologue, which can also be described as "answers-verses" of the poet’s Beloved.

These letters, according to Guliyev, contain "the movement of the plot". There is no dynamic and tense intrigue in the poem. The whole story consists of love experiences, which are based on life facts. Despite the presence of the romantic features, the poem retains realistic elements.

In the poem, according to the researcher Gasim Jahani, the traditions of Nizami Ganjavi, are noticeable, especially the development of the directions in accordance with the spirit of his love philosophy. Thus, in Khatai's "Dahnama" an excerpt called "Bahariya" was added, in the creation of which the poet was inspired from the "Praise of Spring" of Nizami's poem "Leyli and Majnun".

See also 
 Leyli and Majnun

References

Literature 
 
 
 
 
 

Azerbaijani-language literature
16th-century poems